The Gotham Awards are American film awards, presented annually to the makers of independent films at a ceremony in New York City, the city first nicknamed "Gotham" by native son Washington Irving, in an issue of Salmagundi, published on November 11, 1807. Part of the Gotham Film & Media Institute (formerly Independent Filmmaker Project (IFP)), "the largest membership organization in the United States dedicated to independent film" (founded in 1979), the awards were inaugurated in 1991 as a means of showcasing and honoring films made primarily in the northeastern region of the United States.

Scope
In 2004, the scope of the awards broadened to include the international film scene, when the number of awards presented increased from six awards given to films and those involved in making them primarily from the northeastern U.S. film community to nine awards, including in its broader scope films originating in Los Angeles, California, and international locations as well.

Venue
Having outgrown its previous locations in the city's Manhattan borough, for the first time in its history, the 17th Annual Gotham Awards gala occurred outside of that borough, in the city's Brooklyn borough at Steiner Studios, in the Brooklyn Navy Yard, on November 27, 2007, and it was "promoted nationally via a partnership with The New York Times and locally via broadcast on WNYE".

Categories

Current categories

From 1991 to 2002, the Tribute Award, also called Career Tribute, was awarded as a Lifetime Achievement Award to one person each year and the individual achievement awards (Filmmaker Award, Writer Award, Actor Award, Below-the-Line Award, Producer/Industry Executive Award and Independent Vision Award) were given out separately. As of the 2003 Gotham Awards, the
IFP replaced all mentioned individual category awards with Career Tributes.

Discontinued categories
 Filmmaker Award: 1991 to 1997
 Below-the-Line Award: 1991 to 1998
 Writer Award: 1991 to 1998
 Producer/Industry Executive Award: 1991 to 1999
 Actor Award: 1991 to 2002
 Classical Film Tribute: 1999 to 2000
 Anthony Radziwell Documentary Achievement Award: 2000 to 2002
 Independent Vision Award: only 2001
 Celebrate New York Award: 2004 to 2005
 Best Ensemble Cast: 2005 to 2012 (2008 to 2012 as Best Ensemble Performance)
 Best Film Not Playing At Theater Near You: 2005 to 2012
 Special Jury Award for Ensemble Performance: 2014 to 2018
 Best Actor: 2013 to 2020
 Best Actress: 2013 to 2020
 Audience Award: 2010 to 2020

Ceremonies

See also

 List of film awards

References

External links
 
 

 
1991 establishments in New York City
1991 in New York City
Annual events in New York City
Culture of Brooklyn
Culture of Manhattan
Mass media in New York City